Cook County Board of Commissioners 10th district is a electoral district for the Cook County Board of Commissioners.

The district was established in 1994, when the board transitioned to holding elections in individual districts, as opposed to the previous practice of holding a set of two at-large elections (one for ten seats from the city of Chicago and another for seven seats from suburban Cook County).

Geography

1994 boundaries
When the district was first established, the district represented parts of the North Side of Chicago and the northern suburbs of Cook County.

2001 redistricting
New boundaries were adopted in August 2001, with redistricting taking place following the 2000 United States Census.

The district's new boundaries were entirely within the city of Chicago, encompassing parts of the North Side of the city.

The district included the neighborhoods of Lakeview, Uptown, and Rogers Park.

2012 redistricting
The geography of the district, as redistricted in 2012 following the 2010 United States Census, strongly resembled its geography immediately following its previous, 2001, redistricting. The district continues to lie entirely within the city of Chicago, covering parts of the city's North Side.

The district is 16.29 square miles (10,426.27 acres).

Politics
The district has only ever been represented by Democratic commissioners.

List of commissioners representing the district

Election results

|-
| colspan=16 style="text-align:center;" |Cook County Board of Commissioners 10th district general elections
|-
!Year
!Winning candidate
!Party
!Vote (pct)
!Opponent
!Party
! Vote (pct)
!Opponent
!Party
! Vote (pct)
|-
|1994
| |Maria Pappas
| | Democratic
| | 
| | John McNeal
| | Republican
| | 
|Text style="background:#D2B48C | Willie Adams
|Text style="background:#D2B48C | Harold Washington Party
|Text style="background:#D2B48C | 
|-
|1998
| |Mike Quigley
| | Democratic
| | 56,208 (100%)
|
|
|
|
|
|
|-
|2002
| |Mike Quigley
| | Democratic
| |60,457 (100%)
|
|
|
|
|
|
|-
|2006
| |Mike Quigley
| | Democratic
| |62,905 (100%)
|
|
|
|
|
|
|-
|2010
| |Bridget Gainer
| | Democratic
| |56,723 (74.65%)
| | Wes Fowler
| | Republican
| | 19,264 (25.35%)
|
|
|
|-
|2014
| |Bridget Gainer
| | Democratic
| |64,914 (100%)
|
|
|
|
|
|
|-
|2018
| |Bridget Gainer
| | Democratic
| |113,803 (100%)
|
|
|
|
|
|
|-
|2022
| |Bridget Gainer
| | Democratic
| |90,627 (80.76%)
| | Laura Mary Kotelman
| | Republican
| | 21,587 (19.24%)
|
|
|

References

Cook County Board of Commissioners districts
Constituencies established in 1994
1994 establishments in Illinois